Gary Ray Beare (born August 22, 1952) is a former Major League Baseball pitcher who played two seasons with the Milwaukee Brewers. He batted and threw right-handed.

Biography

Early life and education
Beare and attended California State University, Long Beach.

Baseball career
Beare graduated in 1970 from Kearny High School in San Diego, California.  He was drafted by the Milwaukee Brewers in the 5th round of the 1974 amateur draft. He made his major league debut in September 1976 and played his last game in October 1977.

External links

Baseball Reference (Minors)
The Baseball Gauge
Pura Pelota : VPBL pitching statistics
Retrosheet

1952 births
Living people
Águilas del Zulia players
Baseball players from San Diego
Berkshire Brewers players
California State University, Long Beach alumni
Hawaii Islanders players
Leones del Caracas players
American expatriate baseball players in Venezuela
Long Beach State Dirtbags baseball players
Major League Baseball pitchers
Mexican League baseball pitchers
Milwaukee Brewers players
Oklahoma City 89ers players
Spokane Indians players
Tecolotes de Nuevo Laredo players
Thetford Mines Miners players
American expatriate baseball players in Canada
Newark Co-Pilots players
American expatriate baseball players in Mexico
Kearny High School (California) alumni